Maisons-Alfort–Les Juilliottes is a station on line 8 of the Paris Métro in the commune of Maisons-Alfort.

The station opened on 27 April 1972 with the extension of the line from Porte de Charenton–Écoles. It was the eastern terminus of the line until its extension to Créteil–L'Échat on 24 September 1973. It is named after the Juilliottes quarter of Maisons-Alfort.

Station layout

Paris Métro stations in Maisons-Alfort
Railway stations in France opened in 1972